Gang Chung was 6th generation earlier ancestor of Taejo, who was the founder of Goryeo.

Biography 
When Gang Ho-gyeong, the oldest ancestor of Taejo went to hunting in Mount Pyeon Na (Hangul:편나), he met a goddess of  the mountain. She offered him to get married with her and rule theocracy together. However, Gang Ho-gyeong already had a wife. According to a story, he visited his wife in his dream, she got pregnant and Gang Chung was born. Once day, Par Wong, who was a Feng Shui master in Silla visited Gang Ho-gyeong and said “If you plant pine trees in Mount Song ak and hide rocky wall, a person who unify three Korea will be born.” Gang Ho-gyeong followed his prediction and planted pine trees covered rocky wall and Taejo was born.

Family
Father: Gang Ho-gyeong (강호경, 康虎景)
Mother: Unnamed lady (좌곡 여인)
Wife: Lady Gu Chi-ui (구치의, 具置義)
1st son: Yi Je-geon (이제건, 伊帝建)
Granddaughter: Gang Deok-ju (강덕주, 康德州)
2nd son: Gang Bo-yuk (강보육, 康寶育)
Daughter-in-law: Gang Deok-ju (강덕주, 康德州)
3rd son: Gang Bo-jeon (강보전, 康寶甸)

References

See also 
 Founding legends of the Goryeo royal family

Korean generals
Year of birth unknown
Year of death unknown
Sincheon Kang clan